John Nelson Carlisle ( August 24, 1866 - July 21, 1931) was secretary of the New York Democratic Party from 1898 to 1905 and was a delegate to Democratic National Convention from New York in 1904.

Biography
He was born in Preble, New York on August 24, 1866, to Catherine Rose Burdick and William S. Carlisle. He was the great-grandson of William Carlisle and the grandson of Nelson Burdick. He married, January 17, 1894, to Carrie C. Brown. Democrat. Lawyer; chair of Jefferson County Democratic Party, 1891–96; secretary of New York Democratic Party, 1898–1905; delegate to Democratic National Convention from New York, 1904. He died on July 21, 1931.

References

1931 deaths
1866 births